Li Kuge was a Khitan during the Tang dynasty.

History
During the Tang Dynasty, Li Kuge (李窟哥) was given the surname Li (李) from the Tang government because it should be distinguished from a battle in East Manchuria. Li Jinzhong was a grandchild of Li Kuge.

Family
Li Jinzhong, grandson of Li Kuge
Li Kaigu, adopted son of Li Jinzhong
Sun Wanrong, one's wife's brother of Li Jinzhong

7th-century Khitan people
Khitan people in Tang dynasty